The 2023 Washington Huskies football team will represent the University of Washington as a member of the Pac–12 Conference during the 2023 NCAA Division I FBS football season. The Huskies are expected to be led by Kalen DeBoer in his second season as Washington's head coach., They play their home games at Husky Stadium in Seattle.

Schedule

References

Washington
Washington Huskies football seasons
2023 in sports in Washington (state)